Roosevelt, Texas may refer to:

Roosevelt, Kimble County, Texas, a ghost town
Roosevelt, Lubbock County, Texas, an unincorporated community